Mạc Kính Khoan (莫敬寬, ?–1638) was the ninth emperor of the Mạc dynasty. He reigned in 1623–1638.

He was a grandson of Mạc Kính Điển. In 1623, he rebelled against Trịnh lord in Thái Nguyên and enthroned. He was defeated by Trịnh Tráng and fled to Cao Bằng. In 1625, Trịnh Kiều (son of Trịnh Tráng) attacked Cao Bằng and captured Mạc Kính Cung. Khoan fled to Ming China and sent surrender documents to Trịnh lord. He was forgiven by Trịnh lord, and allowed to come back to Cao Bằng. He was granted the title thái úy (太尉) and Thông quốc công (通國公) by Lê dynasty.

References

1638 deaths
Mạc dynasty emperors
Year of birth unknown